This is the results breakdown of the local elections held in Catalonia on 10 June 1987. The following tables show detailed results in the autonomous community's most populous municipalities, sorted alphabetically.

Overall

City control
The following table lists party control in the most populous municipalities, including provincial capitals (shown in bold). Gains for a party are displayed with the cell's background shaded in that party's colour.

Municipalities

Badalona
Population: 225,016

Barcelona

Population: 1,701,812

Cornellà de Llobregat
Population: 86,928

Girona
Population: 67,009

L'Hospitalet de Llobregat
Population: 279,779

Lleida
Population: 107,749

Mataró
Population: 100,021

Reus
Population: 81,145

Sabadell
Population: 186,115

Sant Cugat del Vallès
Population: 30,633

Santa Coloma de Gramenet
Population: 135,258

Tarragona
Population: 106,495

Terrassa
Population: 160,105

References

Catalonia
1987